The Central Exemplary Concert Band of the Russian Navy "Nikolai Rimsky-Korsakov" (Russian:Центральный концертный образцовый оркестр ВМФ им. Н.А. Римского-Корсакова), also known as the Central Navy Band of Russia (Russian:Центральный оркестр ВМФ России) is the official music representative of the Russian Navy. It is based in Moscow. The Conductor/Director of Music is Honored Artist of Russia, 1st rank Captain Alexei Karabanov. The central band is the leading creative team of the Russian Navy, which has been performing for more than 70 years.

History 
On December 23, 1941, the band of the Ulyanovsky Fleet was formed with 53 Musicians, mostly consisting of sailors, front-line soldiers who came from hospitals. The first appointed military conductor was 1st rank Captain Alexander Karpey-Lazarev. In order to improve the training of the musicians of the bands of the navy (especially the fleet forces and the naval infantry), the band was transformed in October 1944 as a training band unit of the Soviet Navy. In February 1993, in honor of the 150th birthday of Russian composer Nikolai Rimsky-Korsakov, the orchestra was given its current honorary name of the Central Concert Band of the Navy Nikolai Rimsky-Korsakov. In different years, the orchestra has performed during concerts in places such as Afghanistan, Chechnya and Syria. Since 1945, the orchestra has been a constant participant in the Victory Parades on Red Square, and since 2017, it has been the main musical participant in Naval Parades in St. Petersburg.

Repertoire 
The following marches are standard for the navy and the central band:
Slow March of the Guards of the Navy
To the native shores
Spring of the 45th March
March of the Marines
March of the Nakhimovtsev
Sailor glory
Navy Guard
Navy Parade
Guarding the sea borders
Farewell of Slavianka
Solemn March
Naval Komsomol
Fleet March
Chernomorets

Gallery

References

External links
 Russian Navy March "Ship's bell" (Valery Khalilov)

Russian military bands
Russian Navy
Musical groups established in 1941
1941 establishments in Russia